Nicot is a French surname. Notable people with the surname include:

 Adriano Nicot (born 1964), Cuban Neoexpressionist painter of French descendance 
 Jean Nicot (1530–1600), French diplomat and scholar
 Jean-Louis Nicot (1911–2004), commander of the French Air transport fleet during the First Indochina War
 Juan Mercado-Nicot (27 August 1862 - 25 January 1954), son of Jose Antonio Mercado and Ramona Nicot.
 Ramona Nicot (Abt. 1827 - 13 July 1909), daughter of Francisco Nicot and Maria Francisca Bernazar.

See also
New International Commentary on the Old Testament, abbreviated as NICOT